Trine Dahl Pedersen is a Danish rower. She represented Denmark at the 2020 Summer Olympics in Tokyo.

References

1996 births
Living people
Danish female rowers
Rowers at the 2020 Summer Olympics
Olympic rowers of Denmark